Wang Congwu (February 1910 – 13 September 2001) was a Chinese Communist politician who was the eleventh president of the Central Party School of the Chinese Communist Party, the highest training center for party workers and leaders. Wang served as president from 1961 to 1963.

References 
 Miniature biography of Wang Congwu
 China Leaders

Chinese Communist Party politicians from Henan
1910 births
2001 deaths
Politicians from Anyang
Republic of China politicians from Henan
People's Republic of China politicians from Henan